Katera is a village in Belarus. It is located in the Kamenets District, Brest Region, 336 km south of the capital Minsk and near the Polish border.

External links 
 
 Location including the places

Villages in Belarus
Populated places in Brest Region
Grodno Governorate
Polesie Voivodeship